MV Shourav was a ferry that sunk in the Buriganga river of Bangladesh on 28 February 2008, killing at least 39 people.

References

Further reading
 
 

Ferries of Bangladesh
Maritime incidents in Bangladesh
Shipwrecks in rivers
Maritime incidents in 2008
2008 in Bangladesh
2008 disasters in Bangladesh